Chaman Bid (also Romanized as Chaman Bīd) is a village in Hamaijan Rural District, Hamaijan District, Sepidan County, Fars Province, Iran. At the 2006 census, its population was 195, in 44 families.

References 

Populated places in Sepidan County